Hildegart Rodríguez Carballeira ( in Madrid in Madrid) was an activist for socialism and sexual revolution, who was raised by her mother as a model for the woman of the future. She spoke four languages when she was eight years old, finished law school as a teenager, and was a leader of the Spanish Socialist Workers' Party (PSOE) which she abandoned in favor of extreme republicanism, joining the Federal Democratic Republican Party (PRDF).

When she was 18 years old and had become internationally known, her mother shot her to death.

Childhood

Conception 

Hildegart was conceived in Ferrol, Spain, by her mother Aurora Rodríguez Carballeira and an undisclosed biological father. Aurora chose the father with eugenic intentions; she wanted to create the perfect child to further her feminist and socialist ideology. She had previously taken care of her sister's son, giving him musical courses until he became a prodigy, but his mother took him to raise him herself. 

When Carballeira was certain that she was pregnant, she moved to Madrid, where Hildegart was born. During her pregnancy, Aurora had set a clock to wake herself up every hour, allowing her to change sleep position so blood could flow to the fetus uniformly.

Her father was a brilliant military chaplain, Alberto Pallás.

Name 
Hildegart's birth certificate and baptism act give her name as Hildegart Leocadia Georgina Hermenegilda Maria del Pilar Rodriguez Carballeira but she only used her first name. Her mother said that Hildegart meant "Garden of Wisdom" in German, but there is no basis for that and the name was either an invention or an alternative spelling of the Nordic/German name Hildegard.

Education 
She knew how to read at 2 and typed before 4. At 10, she spoke German, French and English and the following year gave conferences on feminism and sexuality. Her mother had a total control on Hildegart, forbidding her to do anything which could distract her from "her work."

In June 1928, at the age of 13½, Hildegart enrolled in the School of Law of the Complutense University of Madrid. She later gave lessons at its School of Philosophy during the Second Spanish Republic.

Activism

Politics 
At 14, she joined the PSOE, like her mother. She was also a member of the Unión General de Trabajadores.

In 1932, she was expelled from the PSOE after publishing an article in  criticizing the PSOE for supporting a reactionary candidate; she then joined the Federal Party and started attacking those she termed .

Sexual revolution 
Hildegart was one of the most active people in the Spanish movement for sex reformation, writing on subjects such as contraception, prostitution and eugenics.

She was connected to the European vanguard, corresponding with Havelock Ellis, whose work she translated and who nicknamed her "the Red Virgin", and Margaret Sanger. At the foundation of the Spanish League for Sexual Reform on 1932, presided over by Dr Gregorio Marañón, she was chosen as Secretary without opposition.

She had correspondence with many other European personalities, and accompanied the author H. G. Wells on a visit he made to Madrid, but rejected his offer to go to London as his secretary. This offer by Wells, who wanted her to develop away from the influence of her mother, may have furthered the persecution ideas held by Aurora.

Death

Murder 

Aurora shot her daughter several times while she slept in her bed.

There were several hypotheses about the motive for the murder. Hildegart may have fallen in love. She intended to separate from her mother who, out of paranoia, threatened suicide. Aurora's explanation was, "," "the sculptor, after discovering the most minimal imperfection in his work, destroys it."

Aftermath 

Aurora was tried in Madrid. At her trial, she claimed that a Catalan lawyer, Antonio Villena, H. G. Wells, and Havelock Ellis were the agents of an international conspiracy to have her daughter leave Spain and make her serve the Intelligence Service and that, furthermore, Antonio Villena and Hildegart were lovers. She was sentenced to imprisonment for 26 years, 8 months and 10 days, to which she said she won 26 years to live, expressing joy she will not be locked away in an asylum.

She was later transferred to a mental institution in Ciempozuelos, Madrid, on grounds of paranoia and schizophrenia. From 1941, she stopped speaking to her psychiatrists, and the following year, she made ragdolls with prominent genitals, which were destroyed by the orderlies. In 1948, in a letter to the superior mother of the nuns working in the mental institution, she said she spent a long time in prison and that she deserved to be pardoned.

After she died in 1955 of cancer, she was subsequently buried in a mass grave.

Selected works

Further reading

Works inspired by her life

Novels

Films

References

External link
 

1914 births
1933 deaths
20th-century translators
20th-century women writers
Complutense University of Madrid alumni
Deaths by firearm in Spain
English–Spanish translators
Eugenics in Spain
Filicides
Incidents of violence against girls
People murdered in Spain
Sex educators
Spanish feminists
Spanish murder victims
Spanish socialist feminists
Spanish Socialist Workers' Party politicians
Spanish women in politics